The Center for Reliability Research is a research center at the aerospace research institute, Tehran, Iran. Established in 2009, the center includes institute faculty and staff and external associates. It is involved in research in reliability engineering, modeling and assessment. 
The first Iranian reliability software has been developed by this center. This center organized and held three conferences on reliability engineering (October 2009, October 2011, February 2014).

See also 
 Availability
 Failure rate
 Fault tree
 Reliability (statistics)
 Survival analysis
 Weibull distribution

References

External links
  Official website
 Reliability and Availability Basics
 System Reliability and Availability
Aerospace Research Institute

Organizations established in 2009
2009 establishments in Iran
Reliability engineering
Reliability analysis
Organisations based in Tehran
Aerospace engineering
Aerospace research institutes